Muhammad Serajul Akbar (c. 1944 – 9 March 2015) was a Bangladesh Awami League politician and Member of Parliament.

Biography
Akbar was born in 1944 in Magura District. In 1978 he joined Dhaka Shishu Hospital as its director. He joined the Bangladesh Institute of Child Health as a professor. In 1996 he was elected to parliament from Magura-1 on a Bangladesh Awami League nomination. He was re-elected to 2001. He was the President of Magura District unit Awami League. Akbar was re-elected to parliament in 2008 and 2014. He served as the President of Bangladesh Red Crescent Society.

Death
Mohammad Sirajul Akbar had died on 9 March 2015 in National Institute of Cardiovascular Disease, Dhaka, Bangladesh.

References

Awami League politicians
1944 births
2015 deaths
8th Jatiya Sangsad members
7th Jatiya Sangsad members
People from Magura District
Bangladeshi hospital administrators
Bangladeshi pediatricians